The 1992 Queensland state election was held on 19 September 1992.

By-elections
 On 28 July 1990, Joan Sheldon (Liberal) was elected to succeed Mike Ahern (National), who had resigned on 6 May 1990, as the member for Landsborough.
 On 28 July 1990, David Dunworth (Liberal) was elected to succeed Angus Innes (Liberal), who had resigned on 13 May 1990, as the member for Sherwood.
 On 18 May 1991, Terry Sullivan (Labor) was elected to succeed Phil Heath (Labor), who had resigned on 5 April 1991, as the member for Nundah.
 On 18 May 1991, Mike Horan (National) was elected to succeed Clive Berghofer (National), who had vacated his seat on 23 March 1991, as the member for Toowoomba South.
 On 21 November 1990, the election of Bob King (Liberal) was overturned by the Court of Disputed Returns, who declared National candidate Neil Turner elected rather than ordering a by-election for the seat.

Retiring Members

Labor
 Ron McLean (Bulimba)
 Bill Prest (Port Curtis)
 Nev Warburton (Sandgate)

National
 Des Booth (Warwick)
 Bill Gunn (Somerset)
 Neville Harper (Auburn)
 Bob Katter (Flinders)
 Don Neal (Balonne)

Candidates
Sitting members are shown in bold text.

See also
Members of the Queensland Legislative Assembly, 1989–1992
Members of the Queensland Legislative Assembly, 1992–1995
1992 Queensland state election
List of political parties in Australia

References
Psephos: Adam Carr's Election Archive - Queensland 1995
 Queensland Legislative Assembly (1992). Details of polling at general election held on 19 September 1992.

Candidates for Queensland state elections